Al-Mushannaf (  also spelled Mushennef) is a village in southern Syria, administratively part of the al-Suwayda Governorate, located northeast of al-Suwayda. Nearby localities include Tarba to the north, Shahba and Salkhad to the northwest, Qanawat to the west and al-Kafr to the southwest. According to the Syria Central Bureau of Statistics (CBS), al-Mushannaf had a population of 2,581 in the 2004 census. The town is also the administrative center of the al-Mushannaf nahiyah of the al-Suwayda District consisting of 14 villages with a combined population of 17,134.

History
Al-Mushannaf (ancient Nela or Nelkomia) was a part of the province of Syria under the Roman Empire on the borders with the province of Arabia Petraea.

Druze tribes settled in the village between 1856 and 1858.

Roman-period temple

The village has a well preserved Roman prostyle temple dating to the first century BC that was dedicated to the gods Zeus and Athena. The temple's entrance is aligned to the north and the courtyard has steps that lead to the inner sanctuary. The whole temple is built from the local black basalt rocks. The walls are built without binding materials and display beautiful ornaments including capitals and entablature, while the courtyard is paved with flat stones of various sizes. An inscription inside the temple states that it was built in celebration of the Herodian king Agrippa I. The temple was excavated in the early 1900s by Howard Crosby Butler and later by Clarence Ward, and was partially restored by the Syrian government.

See also
 Druze in Syria

References

Bibliography

External links
Map of the town, Google Maps 

Populated places in as-Suwayda District
Archaeological sites in as-Suwayda Governorate
Roman sites in Syria
Towns in Syria
Druze communities in Syria